The World of Abnormal Psychology is an educational video series produced by Annenberg Media, which examines behavioral disorders in humans. The series is hosted by Dr. Philip Zimbardo of Stanford University, who is best known for his controversial Stanford prison experiment.

Overview 
This series builds on Zimbardo's first series Discovering Psychology and is often shown on PBS stations in the United States. The series has been used in courses at seminaries, and as a resource for teachers. The American Psychological Association lists the series under Education and Psychology.

Episodes 
The series has 13 episodes, each focusing on a different area of abnormal behaviour.

Publications 
The World of Abnormal Psychology, videotape (VHS (13 ea.), 60 minutes per episode, 1991–92), Annenberg/CPB Project,  
The World of Abnormal Psychology: Study Guide, book (3rd ed., 1999), Allyn & Bacon,  
The World of Abnormal Psychology: Faculty Guide, book (2nd ed., 1996), HarperCollins Publishers,  
Abnormal Psychology and Modern Life, book (9th ed., 1992), HarperCollins Publishers,

References 

Abnormal psychology
Mass media franchises introduced in 1992